The 2010–11 Serie A1 was the 66th season of the highest Italian Women's Volleyball League.

Teams

Regular season

|}

Playoffs

Bracket

Eighth-finals

|}

|}

Quarterfinals

|}

|}

|}

|}

Semifinals

|}

|}

Finals

|}

References
Official Site

2010 in Italian sport
2011 in Italian sport
2010–11